Jones Creek is a  long 4th order tributary to the Pee Dee River in Anson County, North Carolina.

Course
Jones Creek is formed at the confluence of North and South Forks of Jones Creek about 1.5 miles north of Morven, North Carolina.  Jones Creek then flows northeast and turns southeast to meet the Pee Dee River about 2 miles southeast of Cairo.

Watershed
Jones Creek drains  of area, receives about 48.0 in/year of precipitation, has a topographic wetness index of 412.50 and is about 58% forested.

References

Rivers of North Carolina
Rivers of Anson County, North Carolina
Tributaries of the Pee Dee River